is a monthly seinen manga magazine in Japan published by Kadokawa Shoten, started in 2009. A spin-off web manga magazine titled Young Ace UP began publication in December 2015.

Series

Young Ace
Akuma no Ikenie (Devil's Sacrifice) by Ayun Tachibana
Another by Yukito Ayatsuji
Appare-Ranman! by 	Masakazu Hashimoto and Ahndongshik
Bio Booster Armor Guyver by Yoshiki Takaya (ongoing, pulled from Monthly Shōnen Ace)
Black Rock Shooter: Innocent Soul by Sanami Suzuki
Blood Lad by Yuuki Kodama
Bungo Stray Dogs by Kafka Asagiri and Sango Harukawa (ongoing)
Busu ni Hanataba o by Roku Sakura
Concrete Revolutio
Deaimon by Rin Asano (ongoing)
Drug & Drop by Clamp
Erased by Kei Sanbe
Echo/Zeon by Koushi Rikudou
Furekurain by Terio Teri
Haijin-sama no End Contents by Satoru Matsubayashi
Hōzuki-san Chi no Aneki by Ran Igarashi
ID: Invaded #Brake Broken by Ōtarō Maijō and Yūki Kodama
Inari, Konkon, Koi Iroha by Morohe Yoshida
 Iinazuke Kyoutei by Fukudāda
Isekai Izakaya "Nobu" by Virginia Nitōhei
Isuca by Osamu Takahashi
Kill La Kill by Ryō Akizuki
Magudala de Nemure by Isuna HasekuraMirai Nikki Paradox, spin-off from Future Diary featuring an alternate timeline.  It lasted five chapters, finishing in February 2010.Mōhitsu Hallucination by DISTANCEMore Than a Married Couple, But Not Lovers by Yūki Kanamaru (ongoing)Multiple Personality Detective Psycho by Eiji Ōtsuka and Shou TajimaThe Disappearance of Nagato Yuki-chan by PuyoToilet ga Hanako-san by Kawano YuusukeNeon Genesis Evangelion by Yoshiyuki SadamotoPanty & Stocking with GarterbeltSugar Apple Fairy Tale adapted by Yozora no Udon original by Miki Mikawa (ongoing)Sugar Dark adapted by Kendi Oiwa original by Enji AraiSummer WarsThe Ideal Sponger Life by Tsunehiko Watanabe, Neko Hinotsuki, and Jū Ayakura (ongoing)The Kurosagi Corpse Delivery Service by Eiji Ōtsuka and Housui Yamazaki (ongoing)Yakumo HakkaiYour Forma by Mareho Kikuishi and Yoshinori Kisaragi (ongoing)

Young Ace UPAccomplishments of the Duke's DaughterThe Deer KingDo You Love Your Mom and Her Two-Hit Multi-Target Attacks?I Kept Pressing the 100-Million Button and Came Out on TopI'm Quitting Heroing (ongoing)Please Go Home, Miss Akutsu! (ongoing)Redo of Healer adapted by Sōken Haga; original by Rui Tsukuyo (ongoing)SK8 the Infinity (ongoing)So I'm a Spider, So What? (ongoing)The Summer Hikaru Died (ongoing) Today's Menu for the Emiya Family (ongoing)Wise Man's Grandchild The World's Finest Assassin Gets Reincarnated in Another World as an Aristocrat'' adapted by Hamao Sumeragi; original by Rui Tsukuyo (ongoing)

References

External links
 
Comic Natalie announcements
ANN announces Young Ace additions

Monthly manga magazines published in Japan
Kadokawa Shoten magazines
2009 establishments in Japan
Magazines established in 2009
Seinen manga magazines